Diederik  Diederick is a Dutch male given name. People with the name include:

Diederik Aerts (born 1953), Belgian theoretical physicist 
Diederik Bangma (born 1990), Dutch football goalkeeper 
Diederik Boer (born 1980), Dutch footballer
Diederik van Dijk (born 1971), Dutch politician
Diederik van Domburg (1685–1736), Dutch governor of Ceylon
Diederik Durven (1676–1740), Dutch Governor-General of the Dutch East Indies
Diederik Foubert (born 1961), Belgian cyclist
Diederik Jansz. Graeff (1532–1589), Dutch merchant, ship-owner and politician
Diederik Grit (1949–2012), Dutch translator and translation scholar
Diederik Hol (born 1972), Dutch design engineer
Diederik Korteweg (1848–1941), Dutch mathematician
Diederik Jekel (born 1984), Dutch science journalist and television presenter
Diederik Johannes Opperman (1914–1985), Afrikaans poet
Diederik van Rooijen (born 1975), Dutch film director
Diederik Samsom (born 1971), Dutch politician
Diederik van Silfhout (born 1988),  Dutch Olympic dressage rider
Diederik Simon (born 1970), Dutch rower
Diederik Sonoy (1529–1597), Dutch rebel leader during the Eighty Years' War
Diederik Stapel (born 1966), Dutch social psychologist
Diederik Tulp (1624–1682), Dutch merchant
Diederik Jacob van Tuyll van Serooskerken (1772–1826), Dutch nobleman, later Russian major general and ambassador
Diederik van Weel (born 1973), Dutch field hockey player
Diederik Wissels (born 1960), Dutch jazz pianist

See also
 Diederik cuckoo, in which Diederik is an onomatopoeic rendition of the bird's call
 Theodoric

Dutch masculine given names